Bad Häring (Central Bavarian: Bod Hearing) is a municipality in the Kufstein district in the Austrian state of Tyrol located 4.30 km northwest of Wörgl and 9 km south of Kufstein. A strong sulfur source was found in 1951 resulting in foundation of health tourism. In 1996 the location was named the "first air spa of Tyrol“.

Population

References

External links

Website of the Health Resort Bad Häring
Website of Bad Häring 
Bad Häring Tourist Board

Spa towns in Austria
Cities and towns in Kufstein District